The black buntingi (Oryzias nigrimas) is a species of fish in the family Adrianichthyidae. It is endemic to Lake Poso in Sulawesi, Indonesia, here it is a pelagic species found over sand and pebble substrates.

References

Oryzias
Freshwater fish of Indonesia
Taxa named by Maurice Kottelat
Taxonomy articles created by Polbot
Fish described in 1990

nl:Schoffeltandkarpers